The South American Handball Championship is the official competition for the men's and women's national handball teams of South America. In addition to crowning the South American champions, the tournament is also a qualifying tournament for the Pan American Handball Championship.

Men

Summary

Medal table

Participating nations

Women

Summary

Medal table

Participating nations

References
 Panama Handball

Handball competitions in South America